The  was a single-member constituency of the House of Representatives in the Diet of Japan. It was located in Japan's northernmost prefecture Hokkaidō and represented the subprefectures of Kamikawa, Rumoi and Sōya. Its only representative was Liberal Democratic Party member Eiko Kaneta, who was elected to the multi-member 2nd district (the predecessor of the 7th district) in 1993

The district was abolished in a 2002 redistricting and reapportionment, with Kamikawa becoming part of the 6th district, Rumoi becoming part of the 10th district, and Sōya becoming part of the 12th district. The then-13th district was renamed to become the current 7th district. As the 6th district was represented by fellow Liberal Democratic member Hiroshi Imazu, Kaneta contested the Hokkaido proportional representation block in the 2003 general election.

List of representatives

Election results

References 

Politics of Hokkaido
Districts of the House of Representatives (Japan)